Praxiteles of Athens, the son of Cephisodotus the Elder, was the most renowned of the Attica sculptors of the 4th century BC. He was the first to sculpt the nude female form in a life-size statue. While no indubitably attributable sculpture by Praxiteles is extant, numerous copies of his works have survived; several authors, including Pliny the Elder, wrote of his works; and coins engraved with silhouettes of his various famous statuary types from the period still exist.

A supposed relationship between Praxiteles and his beautiful model, the Thespian courtesan Phryne, has inspired speculation and interpretation in works of art ranging from painting (Gérôme) to comic opera (Saint-Saëns) to shadow play (Donnay).

Some writers have maintained that there were two sculptors of the name Praxiteles. One was a contemporary of Pheidias, and the other his more celebrated grandson. Though the repetition of the same name in every other generation is common in Greece, there is no certain evidence for either position.

Date

Accurate dates for Praxiteles are elusive, but it is likely that he was no longer working in the time of Alexander the Great, in the absence of evidence that Alexander employed Praxiteles, as he probably would have done. Pliny's date, 364 BC, is probably that of one of his most noted works.

The subjects chosen by Praxiteles were either human beings or the dignified and less elderly deities such as Apollo, Hermes and Aphrodite rather than Zeus, Poseidon or Themis.

Praxiteles and his school worked almost entirely in Parian marble. At the time the marble quarries of Paros were at their best; nor could any marble be finer for the purposes of the sculptor than that of which the Hermes from Olympia was fashioned. Some of the statues of Praxiteles were coloured by the painter Nicias, and in the opinion of the sculptor they gained greatly by this treatment.

Hermes and the Infant Dionysus

In 1911, the Encyclopædia Britannica noted that
 Our knowledge of Praxiteles has received a great addition, and has been placed on a satisfactory basis, by the discovery at Olympia in 1877 of his statue of Hermes with the Infant Dionysus, a statue which has become famous throughout the world.

Later opinions have varied, reaching a low with the sculptor Aristide Maillol, who railed, "It's kitsch, it's frightful, it's sculpted in soap from Marseille". In 1948, Carl Blümel published it in a monograph as The Hermes of a Praxiteles, reversing his earlier (1927) opinion that it was a Roman copy, finding it not 4th century either, but referring it instead to a Hellenistic sculptor, a younger Praxiteles of Pergamon.

The sculpture was located where Pausanias had seen it in the late 2nd century AD. Hermes is represented in the act of carrying the child Dionysus to the nymphs who were charged with his rearing. The uplifted right arm is missing, but the possibility that the god holds out to the child a bunch of grapes to excite his desire would reduce the subject to a genre figure, Waldstein (1882) noted that Hermes looks past the child, "the clearest and most manifest outward sign of inward dreaming". The statue is today exhibited at the Archaeological Museum of Olympia.

Opposing arguments have been made that the statue is a copy by a Roman copyist, perhaps of a work by Praxiteles that the Romans had purloined. Wallace (1940) suggested a 2nd-century date and a Pergamene origin on the basis of the sandal type. Other assertions have been attempted by scholars to prove the origins of the statue on the basis of the unfinished back, the appearance of the drapery, and the technique used with the drilling of the hair; however scholars cannot conclusively use any of these arguments to their advantage because exceptions exist in both Roman and Greek sculpture.

Apollo Sauroktonos
Other works that appear to be copies of Praxiteles' sculpture express the same gracefulness in repose and indefinable charm as the Hermes and the Infant Dionysus.  Among the most notable of these are the Apollo Sauroktonos, or the lizard-slayer, which portrays a youth leaning against a tree and idly striking with an arrow at a lizard.  Several Roman copies from the 1st century are known including those at the Louvre Museum, the Vatican Museums, and the National Museums Liverpool.

Also, the Aphrodite of Cnidus at the Vatican Museums is a copy of the statue made by Praxiteles for the people of Cnidus, and by them valued so highly that they refused to sell it to King Nicomedes in exchange for discharging the city's enormous debt (Pliny).

On June 22, 2004, the Cleveland Museum of Art (CMA), announced the acquisition of an ancient bronze sculpture of Apollo Sauroktonos.  The work is alleged to be the only near-complete original work by Praxiteles, though the dating and attribution of the sculpture will continue to be studied. The work was to be included in the 2007 Praxiteles exhibition organized by the Louvre Museum in Paris, but pressure from Greece, which disputes the work's provenance and legal ownership, caused the French to exclude it from the show.

Apollo Lykeios
The Apollo Lykeios or Lycian Apollo, another Apollo-type reclining on a tree, is usually attributed to Praxiteles. It shows the god resting on a support (a tree trunk or tripod), his right arm touching the top of his head, and his hair fixed in braids on the top of a head in a haircut typical of childhood. It is called "Lycian" not after Lycia itself, but after its identification with a lost work described by Lucian as being on show in the Lykeion, one of the gymnasia of Athens.

Capitoline Satyr

The Resting Satyr of the Capitol at Rome has commonly been regarded as a copy of one of the Satyrs of Praxiteles, but it cannot be identified in the list of his works. Moreover, the style is hard and poor; a far superior replica exists in a torso in the Louvre. The attitude and character of the work are certainly of Praxitelean school.

Leto, Apollo, and Artemis
Excavations at Mantineia in Arcadia have brought to light the base of a group of Leto, Apollo, and Artemis by Praxiteles. This base was doubtless not the work of the great sculptor himself, but of one of his assistants. Nevertheless, it is pleasing and historically valuable. Pausanias (viii. 9, I) thus describes the base, "on the base which supports the statues there are sculptured the Muses and Marsyas playing the flutes (auloi)." Three slabs which have survived represent Apollo; Marsyas; a slave, and six of the Muses, the slab which held the other three having disappeared.

Leconfield Head
The Leconfield Head (a head of the Aphrodite of Cnidus type, included in the 2007 exhibition at the Louvre) in the Red Room, Petworth House, West Sussex, UK, was claimed by Adolf Furtwängler to be an actual work of Praxiteles, based on its style and its intrinsic quality. The Leconfield Head, the keystone of the Greek antiquities at Petworth was probably bought from Gavin Hamilton in Rome in 1755.

Aberdeen Head
The Aberdeen Head, whether of Hermes or of a youthful Heracles, in the British Museum, is linked to Praxiteles by its striking resemblance to the Hermes of Olympia.

Aphrodite of Cnidus

Aphrodite of Cnidus was Praxiteles's most famous statue. It was the first time that a full-scale female figure was portrayed nude. Its renown was such, that it was immortalised in a lyric epigram:

Artemis of Antikyra
According to Pausanias there was a statue of Artemis made by Praxiteles in her temple in Anticyra of Phokis. The appearance of the statue, which represented the goddess with a torch and an arch in her hands and a dog at her feet, is known from a 2nd-century BC bronze coin of the city. A recently discovered dedicatory inscription of the 3rd-2nd century identifies the goddess at Antikya as Artemis Eleithyia.

Uncertain attributions
Vitruvius (vii, . 13) lists Praxiteles as an artist on the Mausoleum of Maussollos and Strabo (xiv, 23, 51) attributes to him the whole sculpted decoration of the Temple of Artemis at Ephesus. These mentions are widely considered as dubious.

Roman copies

Besides these works, associated with Praxiteles by reference to notices in ancient writers, there are numerous copies from the Roman age, statues of Hermes, Dionysus, Aphrodite, Satyrs and Nymphs, and the like, in which a varied expression of Praxitelean style may be discerned.

See also
Marble sculpture

Footnotes

References

References

Bibliography
 Aileen Ajootian, "Praxiteles", Personal Styles in Greek Sculpture (ed. Olga Palagia and J. J. Pollitt), Cambridge University Press, 1998 (1st publication 1996), pp. 91–129.
  Antonio Corso, Prassitele, Fonti Epigrafiche e Lettarie, Vita e Opere, three vol., De Lucca, Rome, 1988 and 1991.
  Marion Muller-Dufeu, La Sculpture grecque. Sources littéraires et épigraphiques, éditions de l'École nationale supérieure des Beaux-Arts, coll. « Beaux-Arts histoire », Paris, 2002, p. 481-521 (new edition of Overbeck's Antiquen Schiftquellen, 1868).
  Alain Pasquier and Jean-Luc Martinez, Praxitèle, catalogue of the exhibition at the Louvre Museum, March 23-June 18, 2007, Louvre editions & Somogy, Paris, 2007.
 Brunilde Sismondo Ridgway, Fourth-Century Styles in Greek Sculpture, University of Wisconsin Press, Madison,, 1997, pp. 258–267.
  Claude Rolley, La Sculpture grecque II : la période classique, Picard, coll. « Manuels d'art et d'archéologie antiques », 1999, pp. 242–267.
 Andrew Stewart, Greek Sculpture: An Exploration, Yale University Press, New Haven & London, 1990 pp. 277–281.

External links

Archaeological Museum of Olympia: The Hermes of Praxiteles
CMA Collections: Apollo Sauroktonos by Praxiteles
About Apollo Sauroktonos statues in marble and bronze
Small head of Aphrodite – Olympia – believed to be an original work by Praxiteles
2007 Praxitèle: 2007 exhibition at the Musée du Louvre Exhibition catalogue by Alain Pasquier and Jean-Luc Martinez.
Antonio Corso. The Art of Praxilites. L'ERma di Bretschneider, Roma 2004. Vol I. The development of Praxiteles' workshop and its cultural tradition until the sculptor's acme (364-1 BC)
Antonio Corso. The Art of Praxilites. L'ERma di Bretschneider, Roma 2004. Vol II. The mature years
Artcyclopedia: Praxiteles

Ancient Athenian sculptors
4th-century BC Greek sculptors